The 2014 German Darts Masters was the third of eight PDC European Tour events on the 2014 PDC Pro Tour. The tournament took place at the Maritim Hotel in Berlin, Germany, between 19–21 April 2014. It featured a field of 48 players and £100,000 in prize money, with £20,000 going to the winner.

Phil Taylor won the title by beating Michael van Gerwen 6–4 in the final.

Prize money

Qualification and format
The top 16 players from the PDC ProTour Order of Merit on 17 March 2014 automatically qualified for the event. The remaining 32 places went to players from three qualifying events - 20 from the UK Qualifier (held in Crawley on 21 March), eight from the European Qualifier and four from the Host Nation Qualifier (held at the venue the day before the event started).

The following players took part in the tournament:

Top 16
  Michael van Gerwen (runner-up)
  Dave Chisnall (third round)
  Brendan Dolan (third round) 
  Kim Huybrechts (third round)
  Peter Wright (second round)
  Robert Thornton (second round)
  Jamie Caven (second round)
  Steve Beaton (quarter-finals)
  Wes Newton (third round)
  Mervyn King (second round)
  Ian White (third round)
  Simon Whitlock (third round)
  Adrian Lewis (semi-finals) 
  Justin Pipe (second round)
  Phil Taylor (winner)
  Andy Hamilton (second round)

UK Qualifier 
  Paul Nicholson (second round)
  Joe Murnan (first round)
  Ronnie Baxter (second round)
  Andy Smith (second round)
  Michael Smith (quarter-finals)
  Peter Hudson (first round)
  Jamie Lewis (first round)
  Alex Roy (first round)
  Ross Smith (first round)
  Steve Douglas (second round)
  Stephen Bunting (semi-finals)
  Steve Hine (first round)
  Dean Winstanley (first round)
  Steve West (second round)
  Mark Webster (first round)
  David Pallett (third round)
  Kirk Shepherd (second round)
  John Henderson (quarter-finals)
  Andrew Gilding (third round)
  Mickey Mansell (first round)

European Qualifier
  Jarkko Komula (second round)
  Raymond van Barneveld (first round)
  Jani Haavisto (second round)
  Ronny Huybrechts (first round)
  Jelle Klaasen (first round)
  Vincent van der Voort (quarter-finals)
  Jerry Hendriks (first round)
  Magnus Caris (second round)

Host Nation Qualifier
  Andree Welge (first round)
  Max Hopp (first round)
  Marcel Hausotter (first round)
  Jyhan Artut (second round)

Draw

References

2014 PDC European Tour
2014 in German sport